Lee Presson and the Nails is a swing band that formed in San Francisco in October 1994 during the late 1990s swing revival.

History 
The band won a California Music Award (Bammie) in 1998 for Best Swing/Cabaret Act and an SF Weekly Award for Best Swing Band later that year. The band temporarily disbanded in 2004 Lee Presson moved to Hollywood, where he played keyboard for the Oingo Boingo tribute band Dead Man's Party. Lee Presson and the Nails performed a reunion show in San Francisco on 16 September 2006 at the DNA Lounge.

Discography
 Jump-Swing from Hell: Live at the Hi-Ball Lounge (Hep Cat, 1998)
 Swing is Dead (Hep Cat, 1999)
 Playing Dirty: LPN Live at the Derby (LPN Enterprises, 2000)
 El Bando En Fuego! (LPN, 2002)
 Balls in Your Face (LPN, 2010)
 Last Request (LPN, 2019)

References

Further reading

External links
 

Swing revival ensembles
American swing musical groups
Musical groups established in 1994
Musical groups disestablished in 2004
Musical groups reestablished in 2006
Musical groups from San Francisco
1994 establishments in California
Jazz musicians from San Francisco
American jazz ensembles from California